Polygonum nuttallii is a North American species of flowering plant in the buckwheat family known by the common name Nuttall's knotweed. It grows in the Pacific Northwest, in British Columbia, Washington, and Oregon.

Stems are thin and wiry. Flowers are white or pink.

References

External links
photo of herbarium specimen at Missouri Botanical Garden, collected in Oregon in 1881

nuttallii
Flora of British Columbia
Flora of Oregon
Flora of Washington (state)
Plants described in 1895
Taxa named by John Kunkel Small
Flora without expected TNC conservation status